The Hoogovens Wijk aan Zee Steel Chess Tournament 1993 was the 55th edition of the Hoogovens Wijk aan Zee Chess Tournament. It was held in Wijk aan Zee in January 1993 and was won by Anatoly Karpov.

The 1993 tournament moved away from its traditional round-robin format, instead being contested as a series of knockout matches. Anatoly Karpov defeated Miguel Illescas in the final 2½ to 1½.

References

Tata Steel Chess Tournament
1993 in chess
1993 in Dutch sport